Nanna Johanna Sumuvuori (born Sari Johanna Sumuvuori, November 8, 1976 in Laihia) is a Finnish politician and former member of Finnish Parliament, representing the Green League. She has also been a member of the city council of Helsinki since 2001. Sumuvuori was first elected as a substitute member to the parliament in 2003, and became member of parliament on August 1, 2006, when Irina Krohn left to become the director of the Finnish Film Foundation. In 2007 she was directly elected, but failed to be returned at the General Election of April 2011. However, when Anni Sinnemäki left her seat in January 2015, Sumuvuori took her seat in the parliament for the remaining term. In the 2015 election, Sumuvuori got 4,159 votes, which was not enough for a seat in the parliament.

Before entering parliament, Sumuvuori has been active in social movements, lastly as the secretary general of Committee of 100.

Since 2015, she holds the post of “Head of Programme, Society” at the Finnish Institute in London.

References

External links
 Official Website of Johanna Sumuvuori

1976 births
Living people
People from Laihia
Green League politicians
Members of the Parliament of Finland (2003–07)
Members of the Parliament of Finland (2007–11)
Members of the Parliament of Finland (2011–15)
21st-century Finnish women politicians
Women members of the Parliament of Finland